Peter Hermann Stillmark (22 July 1860, Penza, Russia – 23 June 1923, Pärnu, Estonia) was a Baltic-German microbiologist.

In 1888 at the University in Dorpat, now Tartu in Estonia under Professor Rudolf Kobert's supervision, Peter Hermann Stillmark (1860–1923)  completed his doctoral thesis Über Ricin, ein giftiges Ferment aus den Samen von Ricinus comm. L. und einigen anderen Euphorbiaceen, which is a description of the isolation of ricin, a poisonous protein component from castor beans. That event is internationally recognised as the birth of a new branch of science called lectinology.

Lectins are any of a group of proteins, derived from plants, that can bind to specific oligosaccharides on the surfaces of cells, causing the cells to clump together. They can be used to identify mutant cells in cell cultures and to determine blood groups, as they can cause the agglutination of red blood cells. Lectins are found in seeds of legumes and other tissues, in which they are thought to act as a toxin.

References
 
 
This article incorporates language from Herrmann Stillmark, which is released under GFDL.

1860 births
1923 deaths
Estonian microbiologists
Baltic-German people
German microbiologists